Vilanova de l'Aguda is a municipality in the  comarca of Noguera, in the province of Lleida, Catalonia, Spain.

References

External links
 Government data pages 

Municipalities in Noguera (comarca)
Populated places in Noguera (comarca)